Modiola is a monotypic genus of plants in the mallow family containing the single species Modiola caroliniana, which is known by several common names including bristly-fruited mallow, Carolina bristlemallow, babosilla, and redflower mallow. It is a creeping perennial which is probably native to South America but which is widely naturalized throughout the tropical and warmer temperate world.

References

External links 
Jepson Manual Treatment

Photo gallery

Malveae
Monotypic Malvales genera
Malvaceae genera